Mhapan is a village surrounded by hillocks in Sindhudurg district, Maharashtra, India. Mhapan has a population of 5,000. Mhapan panchkroshi (adjoining villages) contains approximate 15000 population under villages Khavane, Nivati, Malaiee, Kochra, Medha, Shriramwadi and Paat.

Mhapan has banking facility from Sindhudurg District Central Co-Operative Bank (Now- Sindhudurg Bank, Kotak Mahindra Bank and ATM facility by Bank Of India and Sindhudurg Bank. Mhapan has administrative police station 'Saagari Police station - Nivati) which controls all the surrounding villages of Mhapan having population approx. 25000.

The Mhapan post office pin code is 416522. It has Cellular network coverage of BSNL service.

References 

Villages in Sindhudurg district